In Search of Guru Dutt is a 1989 three-part documentary film on the life and work of Indian actor, writer, director and producer of Hindi films Guru Dutt to mark his 25th death anniversary.

This documentary is a three-part tribute to director Guru Dutt, who died in 1964 at the age of 39. The work traces Guru Dutt's personal story through many interviews with his family members and colleagues and observes his work through the use of extensive film excerpts. The documentary was produced by the British television network Channel 4 producer Nasreen Munni Kabir.

Home media
The documentary was released in a special collector's DVD pack in 2011 in honor of Guru Dutt's 86th birthday anniversary.

References

British documentary films
Documentary films about film directors and producers
Documentary films about the cinema of India
Films about Bollywood
Guru Dutt
1980s British films